The Western Distributor is a  grade-separated motorway that is primarily elevated for the majority of its route on the western fringe of the Sydney central business district in New South Wales, Australia. From its northern terminus, it links the southern end of the Bradfield Highway at the Sydney Harbour Bridge to Victoria Road in Rozelle, at its western terminus near . The freeway is designated as part of the A4 for its entire distance.

History

The Western Distributor came to be out of the realisation in the early 1960s that the existing roads that supported the Harbour Bridge would not cope with contemporary and projected traffic volumes. Due to existing infrastructure and buildings in the area, it was decided to build a viaduct to carry traffic above the city streets. The Western Distributor was opened in stages starting in September 1972, with the last stage being the Anzac Bridge which was opened in December 1995. The distributor also replaces the former congested route out of the city via the Pyrmont Bridge (closed in 1981) and the Glebe Island Bridge (closed in 1995 with the opening of Anzac Bridge).

Western end
When it was built, it was described as the southern end of the F3 Freeway, as that was where the North West Freeway was intended to finish, however due to protests from inner city residents, this plan never came to fruition. The Western Distributor ends west of the Anzac Bridge western ramp and east of the junction between Victoria Road and City West Link, with traffic fed onto either of these roads.

Construction of the Rozelle Interchange as part of Stage 3 of WestConnex is underway. With its scheduled completion in 2023, it will provide traffic-light free access from Sydney's CBD to its outer western suburbs and the Blue Mountains and will become part of the M4.

Abandoned section
Under the Western Distributor viaduct ramps at its northern end, between Sussex and Kent streets, there is an abandoned carriageway underneath the main roadway. It is a short section of elevated freeway; the top tier remains in constant use but the lower is suspended in the air; having been severed at each end.

Route
It is an unusual motorway as, citybound, it heads east, southeast after the Anzac Bridge, east, north then northeast. The freeway distributes traffic arriving from the north (a function which gives the road its name) while collecting traffic from the CBD, distributing it through Pyrmont and Ultimo before crossing over the Anzac Bridge. In the citybound direction, traffic is collected from Victoria Road and the City West Link, as well as various on ramps in the Pyrmont and Ultimo areas. Traffic is distributed into the CBD through various off ramps in Pyrmont and the western edge of the CBD, as well as into the Cross City Tunnel. The remaining traffic is fed into the Bradfield Highway, as it is not possible for northbound traffic to exit onto the Cahill Expressway (traffic travelling east on the Western Distributor wishing to reach the eastern edge of the CBD and beyond must either travel through the Cross City Tunnel or negotiate the packed streets of the CBD).

Exits and interchanges

In popular culture
The road is referenced in the song "Hay Plain" by Australian artist Julia Jacklin.

See also

 Freeways in Sydney
 Eastern Distributor

References

External links
"Western Distributor - Construction Information"
Western Distributor on Google Maps

Highways in Sydney